The King Abdulaziz Historical Center (KAHC) is a translocational compound that includes prominent cultural and heritage landmarks in the al-Murabba and al-Futah neighborhoods of Riyadh, Saudi Arabia, encompassing the al-Murabba Palace, the National Museum, King Abdulaziz Foundation for Research and Archives, King Abdulaziz Public Library, King Abdulaziz Auditorium, Red Palace and Riyadh Water Tower besides six municipal parks and gardens, including the National Museum Park, al-Watan Park, the One Hundred Palm Trees Park and al-Yamamah Park. It was inaugurated in January 1999 by King Fahd to mark the centenary year of the Emirate of Riyadh, the first iteration of modern Saudi Arabia.

It is not the "historic centre" of the city as this lies to the south around Masmak fort and the main Friday Mosque in the Dira district. The origin of the King Abdul Aziz Historical Centre is the former compound of the Murabba' Palace, which was built in 1936/37 by King Abdul Aziz about 1.5 km to the north of the old city and well outside the then still existing city walls.

After 1953, the palace compound ceased to be used as the main royal residence and slowly fell into disuse. The "Murabba' Development Project" was later started to make use of the area for projects involved with the Centennial Celebrations in 1999. As such the area was chosen to be the site of several cultural institutions focusing on the national history in general and the history of the current Saudi State and its founder in detail. Consequently, what had remained of the old palace compound buildings was restored or remodelled on plans similar to the original buildings. The surrounding area was made into a landscape of parks and plazas and new buildings were built such as the National Museum of Saudi Arabia.

The units on the west side of the area are from south to north: A remodelled mosque, the old original Murabba' Palace with main Diwan renovated as a "living museum", the "Memorial Hall" on the outlines of an old courtyard house, a modern exhibition hall for the car collection, on the footprints of the old majlis and assembly hall the new Al-Dara main lobby and multipurpose hall, a documentation centre with a separated men's and women's library each, an art gallery and a large internal garden. On the east side the new National Museum of Saudi Arabia was built together with the King Abdul Aziz Foundation for Research and Archives. To the south, the area around the old water tower has been remodelled and now includes a small theme park. The whole project is said to have cost some 680 million Saudi riyals (about 181.33 million U.S. dollars at the time) and covers an area of some 360,000 square meters (3,000,000 sq ft).

References

Geography of Riyadh
History of Riyadh
Tourist attractions in Riyadh
Museum districts